Peter Fenwick may refer to:

 Peter Fenwick (politician) (born 1944), Canadian politician
 Peter Fenwick (neuropsychologist) (born 1935), neuropsychiatrist and neurophysiologist
 Peter Holmes (businessman) (1932–2002), who wrote as Peter Fenwick